Alan Ogden (born 15 April 1954) is an English former professional footballer who played as a defender in the Football League for Sheffield United and York City, and was on the books of Huddersfield Town without making a league appearance.

References

1954 births
Living people
People from Thrybergh
Footballers from Yorkshire
English footballers
Association football defenders
Sheffield United F.C. players
York City F.C. players
Huddersfield Town A.F.C. players
English Football League players